Førre is a Norwegian surname. Notable people with the surname include:

Ingvald Førre (1879–1962), Norwegian newspaper editor, civil servant, and politician
Signe Førre (born 1994), Norwegian singer, upright bassist, and composer

Norwegian-language surnames